Racing Club Vichy is a French semi-professional rugby union team. They currently play at the Fédérale 2.

External links
  Racing Club Vichy Official Site

Vichy